Marx Weiß the Younger (c. 1518 - 25 February 1580; also known as Marx Weiß of Balingen) was a late Gothic German painter. He was born in Balingen, the son of painter Marx Weiß the Elder, and the brother of painter Joseph Weiß.  He died in Überlingen.

References
 Heidrun Bucher-Schlichtenberger: Künstlerspuren in Balingen in 750 Jahre Stadt Balingen, Balingen, 2005, ps. 454–455.
 Eckart Hannmann: Die Balinger Malerfamilie Weiß (15./16. Jhd.) in Der Zollernalbkreis, second revised edition, Stuttgart, 1989, ps. 218–219.
 Karl Obser: Der Überlinger Maler Marx Weiss († 1580) und seine Familie, in ZGO 71 (1917), p. 131.

16th-century German painters
German male painters
Gothic painters
1510s births
1580 deaths